Moulin Rouge! is a 2001 jukebox musical romantic drama film directed, produced, and co-written by Baz Luhrmann. It follows a young English poet, Christian, who falls in love with the star of the Moulin Rouge, cabaret actress and courtesan Satine. The film uses the musical setting of the Montmartre Quarter of Paris and is the final part of Luhrmann's "Red Curtain Trilogy," following Strictly Ballroom (1992) and Romeo + Juliet (1996). A co-production of Australia and the United States, it features an ensemble cast starring Nicole Kidman and Ewan McGregor, with John Leguizamo, Jim Broadbent, Richard Roxburgh, Jacek Koman and Caroline O'Connor featured in supporting roles.

Moulin Rouge! premiered at the 2001 Cannes Film Festival, where it competed for the Palme d'Or and was  released in theaters on 18 May 2001 in North America and on 25 May 2001 in Australia. The film was praised for Luhrmann's direction, the performances of the cast, its soundtrack, costume design, and production values. It was also a commercial success, grossing $179.2 million on a $50 million budget. At the 74th Academy Awards, the film received eight nominations, including Best Picture, and won two (Best Production Design and Best Costume Design). In BBC's 2016 poll of the 21st century's 100 greatest films, Moulin Rouge! ranked 53rd. A stage musical adaptation premiered in 2018.

Plot
In 1900 in Paris, Christian, a young writer depressed about the recent death of the woman he loved, begins writing their story on his typewriter.

A year earlier, he arrives in the Montmartre district of Paris to join the Bohemian movement. He suddenly meets Henri de Toulouse-Lautrec and his troupe of performers who are writing a play called Spectacular Spectacular. After Christian helps them complete the play, they go to the Moulin Rouge where they hope Christian’s talents will impress Satine, the star performer and courtesan, who will in turn convince Harold Zidler, the proprietor of the Moulin Rouge, to let Christian write the show. However, Zidler plans to have the wealthy, powerful and unscrupulous Duke of Monroth sleep with Satine in exchange for potential financing to convert the club into a theater.

That night, Satine mistakes Christian for the Duke and attempts to seduce him by dancing with him before retiring to her private chamber with him to discuss things privately, but eventually Christian reveals his true identity. After the Duke interrupts them, Satine claims that the two of them and the Bohemians were rehearsing Spectacular Spectacular. Aided by Zidler, Christian and the Bohemians improvise a story for the Duke about a beautiful Indian courtesan who falls in love with a poor sitar player she mistook for an evil maharaja. Approving the story, the Duke agrees to invest, but only if Satine and the Moulin Rouge are turned over to him. Later, Satine claims not to be in love with Christian, but he eventually wears down her resolve and they kiss.

During construction at the Moulin Rouge, Christian and Satine’s love deepens while the Duke becomes frustrated with all the time he thinks Satine is spending with Christian working on the play. To calm him, Zidler arranges for Satine to spend the night with the Duke and angrily tells her to end their affair. She misses the dinner when she falls unconscious, leading a doctor to diagnose a fatal case of consumption. She does try to end things by telling Christian that their relationship is endangering the production, but Christian writes a secret song to include in the show that affirms their unending, passionate love.

At the final rehearsal, Nini, a can-can dancer jealous of Satine's popularity, hints to the Duke that the play represents the relationship between him, Christian, and Satine. Enraged, the Duke demands that the show ends with the courtesan marrying the maharaja, instead of Christian’s ending where she marries the sitar player. Satine promises to spend the night with him after which they will decide on the ending. Ultimately, she fails to seduce the Duke due to her feelings for Christian, and Le Chocolat, one of the cabaret dancers, saves her from the Duke's attempt to rape her. Christian decides that he and Satine should leave the show behind and run away to be together while the Duke vows to kill Christian.

Zidler finds Satine in her dressing room packing. He tells her that her illness is fatal and that the Duke is planning on murdering Christian, and that if she wants Christian to live, she will cut him off completely and be with the Duke. Mustering all her acting abilities, she complies, leaving Christian devastated.

On the opening night of the show, in front of a full audience, Christian denounces Satine and vows to give her to the Duke before walking off the stage, but Toulouse-Lautrec cries out from the rafters, "The greatest thing you'll ever learn is just to love and be loved in return." This spurs Satine to sing their secret song, causing Christian to change his mind. After Zidler and the company thwart several attempts by the Duke and his bodyguard to kill Christian, the show ends with Christian and Satine proclaiming their love as the Duke permanently storms out of the cabaret. The audience erupts in applause, but Satine collapses after the curtains close. Before dying, she tells Christian to write their story so she will always be with him.

In the present, the Moulin Rouge is in disrepair, the Duke and the Bohemians are gone, and Christian finishes his and Satine’s story, declaring their love will live forever.

Cast

Production

Writing and inspiration
Moulin Rouge! was influenced by an eclectic variety of comic and melodramatic musical sources, including the Hollywood musical, "vaudeville, cabaret culture, stage musicals, and operas." Its musical elements also allude to Luhrmann's earlier film Strictly Ballroom.

Giacomo Puccini's opera La bohème, which Luhrmann directed at the Sydney Opera House in 1993, was a key source of the plot for Moulin Rouge!. Further stylistic inspiration came from Luhrmann's encounter with Bollywood films during his visit to India while conducting research for his 1993 production of Benjamin Britten's opera A Midsummer Night's Dream. According to Luhrmann:

In the DVD's audio commentary, Luhrmann revealed that he also drew from the Greek tragedy of Orpheus and Eurydice. The filmmakers projected the Orpheus figure onto Christian by characterizing the latter as a musical genius whose talent surpassed that of everyone else in his world. The film's use of songs from the mid- to late 20th century in the 1899 setting makes Christian appear ahead of his time as a musician and writer. Moulin Rouge!′s plot also parallels that of the myth: "McGregor, as a poet who spouts deathless verse . . . , descends into a hellish underworld of prostitution and musical entertainment in order to retrieve Kidman, the singing courtesan who loves him but is enslaved to a diabolical duke.

Commentators have also noted the similarities between the film's plot and those of the opera La Traviata and Émile Zola's novel Nana. Other cinematic elements appear to have been borrowed from the musical films Cabaret, Folies Bergère de Paris, and Meet Me in St. Louis.

The character of Satine was based on the French can-can dancer Jane Avril. The character of Harold Zidler shares his last name with Charles Zidler, one of the owners of the real Moulin Rouge. Satie was loosely based on the French composers Erik Satie and Maurice Ravel. Môme Fromage, Le Pétomane, and Le Chocolat share their names with performers at the actual cabaret. Marlene Dietrich, Greta Garbo and Rita Hayworth were cited as inspirations for the film's "look."

Development
Leonardo DiCaprio, who worked with Luhrmann on Romeo + Juliet, auditioned for the role of Christian. Luhrmann also considered younger actors for the role, including Heath Ledger and Jake Gyllenhaal, before Ewan McGregor won the part. Courtney Love auditioned for the role of Satine and gave approval for "Smells Like Teen Spirit" to be used in the film.

Filming
Production began in November 1999 and was completed in May 2000, with a budget of $50 million. It was shot on the sound stages at Fox Studios in Sydney. Filming generally went smoothly, but Kidman broke her ribs twice when she was lifted into the air during the dance sequences. She also suffered from a torn knee cartilage resulting from a fall during the "Diamonds Are a Girl's Best Friend" production song. Kidman later stated in an interview with Graham Norton that she broke a rib while getting into a corset by tightening it as much as possible to achieve an 18-inch waist, and that she fell down the stairs while dancing in heels. The production overran its shooting schedule and had to be out of the sound stages to make way for Star Wars: Episode II – Attack of the Clones (which also starred McGregor). This necessitated the filming of some pick-up shots in Madrid.

In the liner notes to the film's Special Edition DVD, Luhrmann writes that "[the] whole stylistic premise has been to decode what the Moulin Rouge was to the audiences of 1899 and express that same thrill and excitement in a way to which contemporary movie-goers can relate." Both Roger Ebert and The New York Times compared the film's editing and cinematography to that of a music video and noted its visual homage to early Technicolor films.

Music
Marsha Kinder describes Moulin Rouge! as a "brilliant," "celebratory," and "humorous" musical and aural pastiche due to its use of diverse songs. Moulin Rouge! takes well-known popular music, mostly drawn from the MTV Generation, and anachronizes it into a tale set in a turn-of-the-century Paris cabaret. Kinder holds that keeping borrowed lyrics and melodies intact "makes it almost impossible for spectators to miss the poaching [of songs] (even if they cannot name the particular source)."

The film uses so much popular music that it took Luhrmann two and a half years to secure the rights to all of the songs. Some of the songs sampled include "Chamma Chamma" from the Hindi movie China Gate, Queen's "The Show Must Go On" (arranged in operatic format), David Bowie's rendition of Nat King Cole's "Nature Boy", "Lady Marmalade" by Labelle (in the Christina Aguilera/P!nk/Mýa/Lil' Kim cover commissioned for the film), Madonna's "Material Girl" and "Like a Virgin", Elton John's "Your Song", the titular number of The Sound of Music, "Roxanne" by The Police (in a tango format using the composition "Tanguera" by Mariano Mores), and "Smells Like Teen Spirit" by Nirvana.

Luhrmann had intended to incorporate songs by The Rolling Stones and Cat Stevens into the film, but could not obtain the necessary rights from these artists. When Stevens denied consent for the use of "Father and Son" due to religious objections to the film's content, "Nature Boy" was chosen as its replacement.

Release and reception
Originally set for release on Christmas 2000, 20th Century Fox eventually moved the release of Moulin Rouge! to Summer 2001 to allow Luhrmann more time in post-production. Moulin Rouge! premiered at the 2001 Cannes Film Festival on May 9, 2001, as the festival's opening title.

Moulin Rouge! opened in the United States at two theaters in New York and Los Angeles on May 18, 2001. It grossed US$167,540 on its opening weekend. The film then expanded to a national release on June 1, 2001. It generated $14.2 million, ranking in fourth place behind Pearl Harbor, Shrek and The Animal. In the United Kingdom, Moulin Rouge! was the country's number one film for two weeks before being displaced by A.I. Artificial Intelligence. During its fifth weekend, it reclaimed the number one spot. The film remained so until it was dethroned by American Pie 2 in its sixth weekend. Moulin Rouge! has grossed $57,386,369 in the United States and Canada and another $121,813,167 internationally (including $26 million in the United Kingdom and $3,878,504 in Australia).

Moulin Rouge! received generally positive reviews from critics. Roger Ebert rated the film 3.5 stars out of 4, remarking that "the movie is all color and music, sound and motion, kinetic energy, broad strokes, operatic excess." Newsweek praised McGregor's and Kidman's performances, stating that "both stars hurl themselves into the movie's reckless spirit, unafraid of looking foolish, adroitly attuned to Luhrmann's abrupt swings from farce to tragedy. (And both sing well.)" The New York Times wrote that "the film is undeniably rousing, but there is not a single moment of organic excitement because Mr. Luhrmann is so busy splicing bits from other films" but conceded that "there's nothing else like it, and young audiences, especially girls, will feel as if they had found a movie that was calling them by name." All Things Considered commented the film was "not gonna be for all tastes" and that "you either surrender to this sort of flamboyance or you experience it as overkill."

Moulin Rouge! holds a rating of 66/100 at Metacritic based on 35 reviews. At Rotten Tomatoes, the film holds a 76% "Fresh" rating based on 199 reviews, with the critics’ consensus saying, "A love-it-or-hate-it experience, Moulin Rouge is all style, all giddy, over-the-top spectacle. But it's also daring in its vision and wildly original." In December 2001, the film was named the best film of the year by viewers of Film 2001. Entertainment Weekly ranked it #6 on its list of the top ten movies of the decade, saying, "Baz Luhrmann's trippy pop culture pastiche from 2001 was an aesthetically arresting ode to poetry, passion, and Elton John. It was so good, we'll forgive him for Australia." In 2008, Moulin Rouge! was ranked #211 on Empire's 500 Greatest Movies of All Time. Audiences polled by CinemaScore gave the film an average grade of "B+" on an A+ to F scale.

Home Theater Forum rated the DVD release of Moulin Rouge! as the best DVD of 2001. Luhrmann had hand-picked the features and behind-the scenes footage for the two-disc DVD edition.

Analysis

Several commentators have interpreted Moulin Rouge! as an exemplar postmodern film. Kathryn Conner Bennett and Mina Yang hold that the film satisfies the postmodern paradigm described by Jim Collins through its aesthetic expression. Elaborating on this, Conner Bennett states that Moulin Rouge! utilizes Collins' concept of "the array," in which signs and symbols are recycled to engender "postmodern cultural life." She argues that Luhrmann's use of familiar "narrative elements" (such as popular songs) in the film requires viewers to employ "hypertextuality"  to understand and interpret the work, and that not all audiences would be able to make the "cognitive leap" required to create meaning from the narrative. According to Yang, Moulin Rouge! "serve[s] as [a critique] of both avant-garde élitism and stuffy traditionalism" by combining and alluding to different forms of "élite" and "pop" art.

The film's music forms the foundation of its postmodern aesthetic. Marsha Kinder and Mina Yang have noted Moulin Rouge!’s reflexivity as a movie musical, holding that the film incorporates a variety of genre conventions (including "comedy, parody, and satire") along with a significant amount of added irony. Notably, Moulin Rouge! combines mid-to-late 20th Century melodies and lyrics with a narrative set in fin de siècle France, a locale Kinder identifies as "the proverbial international center for modernism." "The gap in historical periods (between the supposed vintage of [Luhrmann’s] characters and the obvious youth of their songs) freely acknowledges the contemporary nature of this vision of Parisian modernism without any trace of nostalgia." Yang notes that Luhrmann "delights in pointing out the difference between the original and the simulation" with regard to the film's soundtrack. Kinder contends that Moulin Rouge!’s "renarrativized lyrics are never disturbing, for they are usually more innocent here than in their original source, and that’s precisely the point." The use of famous popular songs in a new, original context requires audiences to reinterpret their significance within the framework of the narrative and challenge the assumption that music's symbolism is static.

Moulin Rouge! also makes ample use of other postmodern filmmaking techniques, including fragmentation and juxtaposition. As the film's protagonist, Christian is the primary source of Moulin Rouge!’s story line and many portions of the story are told from his point of view. However, the narrative is fragmented on several occasions when the film deviates from Christian’s perspective or integrates a flashback. Moulin Rouge! also juxtaposes a play-within-a-film (Spectacular Spectacular) with the film’s events themselves to draw parallels between the plot of the play and the characters’ lives. This culminates in the "Come What May" sequence, which reveals the development of Christian and Satine's relationship alongside the progression of Spectacular Spectacular’s rehearsals.

Postmodernism is also evident in Moulin Rouge!’s homage to "the international scope of the musical," says Kinder, citing the influence of Western filmmaking genres on the film's overall style. The film is also heavily indebted to Strictly Ballroom, which she characterizes as a "transcultural concoction." Moulin Rouge!’s celebration of the cross-cultural aesthetic "also extends to globalizing postmodernist spin-offs like [the] music video."

Yang states that the plot, style, and themes of Moulin Rouge! serve as a foundation for understanding ways in which "sex, class, exoticism, authorship and performance" are represented in stage and film. The film's blending of opera and Hollywood musical enables its interpretation through the "feminist, poststructuralist, and postcolonial" lenses of contemporary opera scholarship. Yet, despite the film's postmodern stylings, Conner Bennett argues that  Moulin Rouge! is not a feminist text because it "ultimately upholds the patriarchical execution of the female muse, which allows the male artist to create art via her death."

Awards and honors
The film was selected by the National Board of Review as the best film of 2001. It picked up six Golden Globe nominations including Best Motion Picture – Musical or Comedy, Best Actress in a Motion Picture – Musical or Comedy (for Nicole Kidman), Best Actor in a Motion Picture – Musical or Comedy (for Ewan McGregor), Best Original Score (for Craig Armstrong), Best Director (for Baz Luhrmann) and Best Song ("Come What May"). It won three including the coveted Best Picture trophy. A few weeks later, it received 12 nominations at the BAFTA Awards, making it the most nominated film of the year for that ceremony. It took home three, including Best Supporting Actor for Jim Broadbent.

The film received eight Oscar nominations, including Best Actress in a Leading Role and Best Picture. It became the first musical film to receive a Best Picture nomination since Beauty and the Beast in 1992. The film was not nominated for Best Director (Luhrmann); commenting on this during the Oscar ceremony, host Whoopi Goldberg remarked, "I guess Moulin Rouge! just directed itself." The film won the awards for Best Costume Design and Best Art Direction.

"Come What May" (the only original song in the film) was disqualified from nomination for an Oscar because it was originally written (but unused) for Luhrmann's previous film Romeo + Juliet and not written expressly for Moulin Rouge!.

Soundtrack

Musical numbers 
 "Nature Boy" – Toulouse
 "Complainte de la Butte/Children of the Revolution"
 "The Sound of Music" – Toulouse, Christian, and Satie
 "Green Fairy Medley" (The Sound of Music/Children of the Revolution/Nature Boy) – Christian, The Bohemians, and the Green Fairy
 "Zidler's Rap Medley" (Lady Marmalade/Zidler's Rap/Because We Can/Smells Like Teen Spirit) – Zidler, Moulin Rouge Dancers, Christian and Patrons
 "Sparkling Diamonds" (Diamonds Are a Girl's Best Friend/Material Girl) – Satine and Moulin Rouge Dancers
 "Rhythm of the Night" – Moulin Rouge Dancers
 "Sparkling Diamonds" (Reprise) – Satine
 "Meet Me in the Red Room"
 "Your Song" – Christian
 "Your Song" (Reprise) – Satine
 "The Pitch" - Spectacular Spectacular – Zidler, Christian, Satine, The Duke, and Bohemians
 "One Day I'll Fly Away" – Satine and Christian
 "Elephant Love Medley" – Christian and Satine
 "Górecki" – Satine
 "Like a Virgin" – Zidler, The Duke, and Chorus Boys
 "Come What May"  – Christian, Satine, the Argentinean and Cast of Spectacular Spectacular
 "El Tango de Roxanne" – The Argentinean, Christian, Satine, The Duke, and Moulin Rouge Dancers
 "Fool to Believe" – Satine
 "One Day I'll Fly Away" (Reprise) – Satine and Zidler
 "The Show Must Go On" – Zidler, Satine, and Moulin Rouge Stagehands
 "Hindi Sad Diamonds" (Chamma Chamma/Diamonds Are a Girl's Best Friend) – Toulouse, Nini Legs-in-the-Air, Satine, and the Cast of Spectacular Spectacular
 "Come What May" (Reprise) – Satine and Christian
 "Coup d'État"/"Finale" (The Show Must Go On/Children of the Revolution/Your Song/One Day I'll Fly Away/Come What May) – Christian, Satine, and Cast of Spectacular Spectacular
 "Nature Boy" (Reprise) – Toulouse and Christian

Music sources
 "Nature Boy" – Nat King Cole, covered by David Bowie and remixed by Massive Attack for the soundtrack.
 "The Sound of Music" – Mary Martin (and later by Julie Andrews) (from the Rodgers & Hammerstein musical of the same name, featuring overdubbed theremin played by Bruce Woolley)
 "The Lonely Goatherd" – also from The Sound of Music (but heard as instrumental)
 "Lady Marmalade" – Labelle, covered for the film, (by Christina Aguilera, Lil' Kim, Mýa, Missy Elliott, and Pink)
 "Because We Can" – Fatboy Slim
 "Complainte de la Butte" – Georges Van Parys and Jean Renoir covered by Rufus Wainwright
 "Rhythm of the Night" – DeBarge
 "Material Girl" – Madonna
 "Smells Like Teen Spirit" – Nirvana
 "Diamonds Are a Girl's Best Friend" – Introduced by Carol Channing, made popular by Marilyn Monroe.
 "Diamond Dogs" – David Bowie covered for the film by Beck.
 "Galop Infernal (Can-can)" – Jacques Offenbach (tune for Spectacular, Spectacular)
 "One Day I'll Fly Away" – The Crusaders, later Randy Crawford
 "Children of the Revolution" – T.Rex (Covered by Bono, Gavin Friday, Violent Femmes, and Maurice Seezer)
 "Gorecki" – Lamb
 "Come What May" – Ewan McGregor and Nicole Kidman (written by David Baerwald)
 "Roxanne" – The Police (Title in film: "El Tango de Roxanne", combined with music "Tanguera" by Mariano Mores)
 "Tanguera" – Mariano Mores (Title in film: "El Tango de Roxanne", combined with music "Roxanne" by The Police)
 "The Show Must Go On" – Queen
 "Like a Virgin" – Madonna
 "Your Song" – Elton John
 "Chamma Chamma" – Alka Yagnik (Incorporated in the film song titled "Hindi Sad Diamonds"; originally performed by Alka Yagnik in the 1998 Hindi film China Gate, composed by Anu Malik).

Elephant Love Medley

 "Love Is Like Oxygen" by Sweet – Andy Scott and Trevor Griffin
 "Love Is a Many-Splendored Thing" by The Four Aces – Sammy Fain and Paul Francis Webster
 "All You Need Is Love" by The Beatles – John Lennon and Paul McCartney
 "I Was Made for Lovin' You" by Kiss – Desmond Child, Paul Stanley, Vini Poncia
 "One More Night" by Phil Collins – Phil Collins
 "In the Name of Love" by U2 – U2
 "Don't Leave Me This Way" by Harold Melvin & the Blue Notes and later Thelma Houston – Kenneth Gamble, Leon Huff, and Cary Gilbert
 "Silly Love Songs" by Wings – Paul McCartney
 "Up Where We Belong" by Joe Cocker and Jennifer Warnes – Jack Nitzsche and Buffy Sainte-Marie
 "Heroes" by David Bowie – David Bowie
 "I Will Always Love You" by Dolly Parton and later Whitney Houston – Dolly Parton
 "Your Song" by Elton John – Elton John and Bernie Taupin

Jamie Allen contributes additional vocals to the "Elephant Love Medley." "Love Is Like Oxygen" and "Love Is a Many-Splendored Thing" are only spoken dialogue; they are not actually sung in the medley.

"Your Song" is performed by Ewan McGregor and Alessandro Safina, who contributes additional lyrics in Italian.

Two soundtrack albums were released, with the second coming after the first one's massive success. The first volume featured the smash hit single "Lady Marmalade", performed by Christina Aguilera, Lil' Kim, Mýa and Pink. The first soundtrack, Moulin Rouge! Music from Baz Luhrmann's Film, was released on 8 May 2001, with the second, Moulin Rouge! Music from Baz Luhrmann's Film, Vol. 2, following on 26 February 2002.

Stage adaptation

As early as November 2002, Luhrmann revealed that he intended to adapt Moulin Rouge! into a stage musical. A Las Vegas casino was the reputed site of the proposed show. Luhrmann was said to have asked both Kidman and McGregor to reprise their starring roles in the potential stage version.

In 2008, a stage adaptation entitled La Belle Bizarre du Moulin Rouge ("The Bizarre Beauty of the Moulin Rouge") toured Germany and produced a cast recording.

In 2016, it was announced that Global Creatures was developing Moulin Rouge! into a stage musical. Alex Timbers was slated to direct the production, and John Logan was tapped to write the book. Moulin Rouge!: The Musical, starring Aaron Tveit as Christian and Karen Olivo as Satine, premiered on 10 July 2018 at the Colonial Theatre in Boston. The Broadway production opened at the Al Hirschfeld Theatre on 25 July 2019.

In popular culture
The 2002 made for television movie, It's a Very Merry Muppet Christmas Movie, features a Christmas-themed parody entitled "Moulin Scrooge", in which various scenes and musical numbers are re-enacted by Muppets. In Moulin Scrooge, Christian is played by Kermit the Frog, Satine (named Saltine) by Miss Piggy, Toulouse-Lautrec by Gonzo and Zidler by Fozzie Bear.

In the 2017–18 figure skating season,  at the 2018 Winter Olympics, Canadian skaters Tessa Virtue and Scott Moir performed two selections from Moulin Rouge!, interpreting the story of Christian and Satine through "The Show Must Go On", "El Tango de Roxanne", and "Come What May". Their performance won the gold medal in the team and the individual events. At this event, Virtue and Moir became the most decorated skaters of all time.

See also
 Moulin Rouge, 1928 film
 Moulin Rouge, 1952 film

References

Notes

External links

 
 
 
 
 
Moulin Rouge! at Oz Movies

2001 films
2001 romantic drama films
2000s American films
2000s dance films
2000s English-language films
2000s historical drama films
2000s historical romance films
2000s musical drama films
2000s romantic musical films
20th Century Fox films
American alternate history films
American dance films
American historical drama films
American historical musical films
American historical romance films
American musical drama films
American romantic drama films
American romantic musical films
Australian alternative history films
Australian historical drama films
Australian historical romance films
Australian musical drama films
Australian romantic drama films
BAFTA winners (films)
Best Musical or Comedy Picture Golden Globe winners
Bohemianism
Cultural depictions of Henri de Toulouse-Lautrec
European Film Awards winners (films)
Films about prostitution in Paris
Films about tuberculosis
Films about writers
Films adapted into plays
Films directed by Baz Luhrmann
Films featuring a Best Musical or Comedy Actress Golden Globe winning performance
Films scored by Craig Armstrong (composer)
Films set in 1899
Films set in 1900
Films set in the Moulin Rouge
Films shot in Madrid
Films shot in Sydney
Films that won the Best Costume Design Academy Award
Films whose art director won the Best Art Direction Academy Award
Jukebox musical films
Moulin Rouge!
Postmodern films